Articles related to the French overseas department of Guiana (Région Guyane) include:

0–9

.gf – Internet country code top-level domain for French Guiana

A
Abounamy
Acarouany
Adjacent countries:

Air Guyane Express
Airports in French Guiana
Akouménaye
Alicoto
Aluku
Americas
South America
North Atlantic Ocean
Islands of French Guiana
Anarchism in French Guiana
Andrée-Rosemon Hospital
Apatou
Approuague
Arrondissement of Cayenne
Arrondissement of Saint-Laurent-du-Maroni
Arrondissements of the Guyane department
Atipa
Atlantic Ocean
Atlas of French Guiana
Awala-Yalimapo
Awara broth

B
Balaté
Bélizon
Bienvenue, French Guiana
Birds of French Guiana
Boniville

C
Cacao, French Guiana
Calou
Camopi
Camopi (river)
Canton of Approuague-Kaw
Cantons of the Guyane department
Capital of French Guiana:  Cayenne
Carib language
Carnival in Cayenne
Carnival in French Guiana

Categories:
:Category:French Guiana
:Category:Buildings and structures in French Guiana
:Category:Communications in French Guiana
:Category:French Guianan culture
:Category:Economy of French Guiana
:Category:Education in French Guiana
:Category:Environment of French Guiana
:Category:French Guiana-related lists
:Category:Geography of French Guiana
:Category:Government of French Guiana
:Category:History of French Guiana
:Category:French Guianan people
:Category:Politics of French Guiana
:Category:Prisons in French Guiana
:Category:Society of French Guiana
:Category:Sport in French Guiana
:Category:Transport in French Guiana
commons:Category:French Guiana
Cayenne Cathedral
Cayenne – Capital of French Guiana
Cayenne-Rochambeau Airport
Charvein
Christiane Taubira
Cities of French Guiana
Clément, French Guiana
Coat of arms of French Guiana
Communes of the Guyane department
Communications in French Guiana
Coopérative de Pêche de Guyane
Cormotibo
Couac
Coulor
Countess (cake)
Creole galette
Cuachi

D
Délices
Demographics of French Guiana
Devil's Island
Dizé milé
Dominique Vian
Dry Guillotine
Dokonon

E
Economy of French Guiana
Elections in French Guiana
Espérance

F

Falkland Islands
Flag of France
Flag of French Guiana
Florent Malouda
France
French America
French colonization of the Americas
French Guiana (Région Guyane)
French Guiana Creole language
French Guiana national football team
French Guianan franc
French Guianese, adjective and noun
French language
French Republic (République française)

G
Geography of French Guiana
Grand-Santi
Guiana Amazonian Park
Guianan Cuisine
Guiana Shield
Guiana Space Centre
Guisanbourg

H
Hinduism in French Guiana
History of French Guiana

I
Île Portal
Île Royale
Île Saint-Joseph
Iles du Connétable
Îles du Salut
Îlet la Mère
Inini
Inini (river)
International Organization for Standardization (ISO)
ISO 3166-1 alpha-2 country code for French Guiana: GF
ISO 3166-1 alpha-3 country code for French Guiana: GUF
Iracoubo
Islands of French Guiana

J
Jardin botanique de Cayenne
Javouhey
Jean-Claude Darcheville
Jean-Marie Collot d'Herbois

K
Kaliña
Kasékò
Kaw, French Guiana
Kourou
Kourou (river)
Koursibo

L
La Charbonnière
Ligue de Football de Guyane
Lists related to French Guiana:
List of airports in French Guiana
List of birds of French Guiana
List of cities in French Guiana
List of French Guiana-related topics
List of rivers of French Guiana
Litani

M
Macouria
Mahury
Malia Metella
Malmanoury
Mana, French Guiana
Maripasoula
Maroni
Matoury
Military of French Guiana
Montagne d'Argent
Montsinéry-Tonnegrande
Music of French Guiana

N
 Nouragues Nature Reserve

O
Ouanary
Oyapock

P
Palikur
Papaïchton
Paré-maské balls
Paul Isnard
Pointe Béhague
Pointe Isère
Politics of French Guiana
Prison of the Annamites
Prison of St-Laurent-du-Maroni
Providence, French Guiana

R
Régina
Région Guyane (French Guiana)
Remire-Montjoly
Republic of Independent Guyana
République française (French Republic)
Rivers of French Guiana
Roman Catholicism in French Guiana
Roura
Route nationale 1

S
Saint-Élie
Saint-Georges, French Guiana
Saint-Jean-du-Maroni
Saint-Laurent-du-Maroni
Saint-Nazaire
Sainte-Rose-de-Lima
Saramaccan language
Saramaka, French Guiana
Saül
Scouting in French Guiana
Sinnamary
Sinnamary (river)
South America
South Georgia and the South Sandwich Islands

T
Tampok
Tonnegrande
Touloulou
Tour of Guiana
Transport in French Guiana
Trésor Regional Nature Reserve
Trois Sauts
Trou Poisson
Tumuk Humak Mountains

U
Ulrich Robeiri
University of the French West Indies and Guiana

V
Victor Hugues
Voltaire Falls

W
Waki
Wayampi

Y
Yaloupi

See also

List of international rankings
Lists of country-related topics
Topic outline of geography
Topic outline of South America

External links

 
French Guiana